Cristenes cristatus is a species of beetle in the family Cerambycidae, and the only species in the genus Cristenes. It was described by Pic in 1928.

References

Acanthocinini
Beetles described in 1928
Monotypic Cerambycidae genera